Petrovac, also known as Petrovac na Mlavi ("Petrovac upon(on the) Mlava") is a town and municipality located in the Braničevo District of the eastern Serbia. In 2011, the population of the town is 7,229, while population of the municipality is 31,259.

History
From 1929 to 1941, Petrovac was part of the Morava Banovina of the Kingdom of Yugoslavia.

Demographics

Economy
The following table gives a preview of total number of registered people employed in legal entities per their core activity (as of 2018):

References

External links

 

Populated places in Braničevo District
Municipalities and cities of Southern and Eastern Serbia